Events in the year 1855 in India.

Incumbents
James Broun-Ramsay, 1st Marquess of Dalhousie, Governor-General of India, 1848 to 1856
Muhammad Said Khan, Nawab of Rampur from 1840 to 1855, died on 1 April
Ghulam Muhammad Ghouse Khan, Nawab of the Carnatic, 1825-1855
Balwantrao Raje Ghorpade, Raja of Mudhol State, December 1854-27 March 1862
Thakur Sahib Jashwantsimhji Bhavsimhji, Rajput of Bhavnagar State, 1854–11 April 1870

Events
Santhal rebellion against British rule
The British annexed Thanjavur Maratha kingdom
Dinavartamani was established in Madras as a weekly Tamil-Telugu paper
Bombay, Baroda and Central India Railway was incorporated to undertake the task of constructing a railway line between Bombay and Vadodara
Rani Rashmoni funded construction of the Dakshineswar Kali Temple in Dakshineswar near Kolkata
Central Museum of Natural History, Economy, Geology, Industry and Arts was established in Bombay
Napier Museum, an art and natural history museum situated in Thiruvananthapuram, was established
Madras Zoo opened
Narayan Jagannath High School, the first government school established in Sindh, was established in Kerachi
William Healey Dall moved to India to work as a missionary

Law
Legal Representatives Suits Act
Fatal Accidents Act

Births
G. Subramania Iyer, leading Indian journalist, social reformer and freedom fighter who founded The Hindu, born on 19 January in Tiruvadi, Tanjore district
A. Subbarayalu Reddiar, a landlord, Justice Party leader and Chief Minister or Premier of Madras Presidency from 17 December 1920 to 11 July 1921, born on 15 October in Madras
N. G. Chandavarkar, born on 2 December in Honavar in the Bombay Presidency
Sudhakar Dwivedi, Indian scholar in Sanskrit and mathematics, born in Khajuri, a village near Varanasi
Hakim Abdul Aziz, prominent Unani physician, born in Lucknow
Govind Ballal Deval, a Marathi playwright from Maharashtra
Kottarathil Sankunni, author of Malayalam literature, was born on 23 March in Kottayam, Travancore

Deaths
Henry Valentine Conolly, British administrator in southern India, murdered by Moplah (Mappila - Muslim) insurgents at Collector's Residence at West Hill Bungalow, Calicut on 11 September
Muhammad Said Khan, Nawab of Rampur from 1840 to 1855, died on 1 April
Ghulam Muhammad Ghouse Khan, Nawab of the Carnatic
Mahmud Gami, introduced in Kashmiri the Persian forms of the masnavi and ghazal

 
India
Years of the 19th century in India